Tasty is a 1974 album by Good Rats and was released on the Warner Brothers Records label.

Track listings
Words and music by Peppi Marchello – arranged by Good Rats
 "Back To My Music" 2:34
 "Injun Joe"  5:28
 "Tasty" 3:22
 "Papa Poppa" 5:08
 "Klash-Ka-Bob" 3:34
 "Fireball Express" 3:16
 "Fred Upstairs & Ginger Snappers" 3:11
 "300 Boys" 3:49
 "Phil Fleish" 4:00
 "Songwriter" 3:50

A 2018 Record Store Day vinyl album had a different track ordering and added a bonus track:

11. "Melting Pot Cookbook (Bonus Demo)" 3:35

Personnel
Peppi Marchello – lead vocals, harmonica, and bats
Mickey Marchello – guitar, vocals
John "The Cat" Gatto – guitar
Lenny Kotke – bass, vocals
Joe Franco – drums

Production
Stephan Galfas – Producer
George Marino – mastering

Sources
 Good Rats' Tasty album cover (Fireball Records CD release)
 Tasty (Good Rats album)

References

1974 albums
The Good Rats albums
Warner Records albums
American rock music groups